The University of Texas at Tyler (UT Tyler) is a public research university in Tyler, Texas. Founded in 1971, it is a part of the University of Texas System.

UT Tyler consists of six professional colleges and one traditional college of arts and sciences, offering over 90 academic degree programs at the bachelor, master, and doctoral levels. The University of Texas at Tyler is accredited by the Southern Association of Colleges and Schools. The university had a fall 2020 student body enrollment of 9,927 and a 19:1 student to faculty ratio. It has a park-like campus.

History 
The University of Texas at Tyler was founded in 1971 as Tyler State College. The school was renamed Texas Eastern University in 1975, and then joined the University of Texas System in 1979 as a result of action by the 66th Texas Legislature. Initially, UT Tyler was a "senior" level institution ("senior" as compared to community or junior colleges), teaching only upper division undergraduate courses for juniors & seniors, as well as graduate level courses, and granting bachelor's and master's degrees. Thus, until 1998, all U.T. Tyler students were transfer students from other institutions of higher learning—junior colleges or other universities. In 1997, the 75th Texas Legislature passed House Bill 1795, signed into law by Governor George W. Bush, authorizing the school to add classes for freshmen and sophomore students. As of the Fall semester 1998, UT Tyler became a 4-year and graduate institution, following the full U.S. university pattern, i.e. educating students from the freshman level through graduate and postgraduate levels.

In late 2019, the UT System Board of Regents unanimously agreed to merge the University of Texas Health Science Center at Tyler (UTHSCT) under the University of Texas at Tyler (UTT), creating a single unified institution. Two months later, the UT System formally announced its intention to establish a new medical school that will be added under the new unified UT Tyler administration. It will be the first medical school in the East Texas region. The plan was approved by the university's accreditor, the Southern Association of Colleges and Schools Commission on Schools, in 2020. UTHSCT will retain its status as a health-related institution but will now come under the administration of UT Tyler.

The merger officially began in January 2021. The Board of Regents installed Dr. Kirk A. Calhoun, M.D. as president of the newly aligned UT Tyler and UTHSCT. The medical school is expected to open in 2023.

University Academy
UT Tyler's College of Education and Psychology has operated the UT Tyler University Academy since its founding in 2012. The University Academy has campuses on UT Tyler's Campus, on UT Tyler's Longview University Center, and on UT Tyler's Palestine Campus.

University Academy offers grades K-12, with a focus on STEM and most students graduating with 30 credit hours from UT Tyler. The Schools also serve as labs for students of the UTeach program and for faculty of the College of Education and Psychology.

Academics 
In addition to its undergraduate programs, UT Tyler offers doctoral studies in nursing, pharmacy, and human resource development. It also offers a selective four-year honors program for high-achieving undergraduate students of all majors. For the Fall 2020 semester, UT Tyler had a 92% acceptance rate. The U. S. News & World Report rankings released in 2021 placed UT Tyler #299-#391 in National Universities, tied for #179 in Top Performers on Social Mobility, #156-#209 in Top Public Schools, and tied for #75 in Best Undergraduate Engineering Programs at schools where doctorates are not offered.

The university supports seven undergraduate colleges and two professional schools:

Colleges

 College of Arts and Sciences
 Soules College of Business
 College of Education and Psychology
 College of Engineering
 School of Health Professions
 School of Nursing
 UT Tyler Honors College
Professional Schools

 The Ben and Maytee Fisch College of Pharmacy
 School of Medicine

Campus 

The UT Tyler campus is master-planned with an integrated architectural style of buildings. Because of vigorous growth in enrollment, many new buildings and sports facilities have been constructed at the main campus since 1996.

One of the most prominent features of the UT Tyler campus is the Riter Tower, an  instrument featuring 57 bells. The tower was built with a $1.35 million gift from Mr. and Mrs. A.W. "Dub" Riter Jr. The bells are played with an electronic keyboard connected at sites in the music department, the administration building, or at the base of the tower.

The Herrington Patriot Center includes a state-of-the-art fitness center with cardio-theater and circuit training, racquetball courts, heated pool and spa, indoor walking/jogging track, and gymnasium/convocation area with basketball/volleyball court and seating for 2,300.

The 2,000 seat R. Don Cowan Fine and Performing Arts Center attracts a wide array of cultural entertainment, and 26,000 patrons attend the performances annually.

On-campus housing options include one dormitory, Ornelas Hall, and four apartment complexes, Patriot Village, Liberty Landing and Victory Village which are owned by UT Tyler, and University Pines, which is owned by an outside company but is on university land and works in conjunction with the university.

Since 2019, the university has added a large outdoor green space (called Patriot Plaza) for recreation and events, as well as an Alumni House.

Research 
With over $28 million in annual research expenditures, UT Tyler is classified among "R2: Doctoral Universities – High research activity".

Funding
UT Tyler has access to the State of Texas's Permanent University Fund (PUF), with over $32 billion in assets . These funds are primarily used for infrastructure improvements and expansion, as well as the repayment of debts.

The university also has its own endowment worth $154.96 million as of 2021. Furthermore, UT Tyler is part of the University of Texas System, which has an endowment of $42.9 billion as of 2021, the most of any public university system in the world and second only to Harvard.

Student life 

UT Tyler offers over 90 student organizations including Greek fraternities and sororities.

Greek Sororities
Alpha Chi Omega, Kappa Mu chapter
Gamma Phi Beta, Zeta Upsilon chapter (currently Inactive)
Delta Gamma, Eta Xi chapter
Zeta Tau Alpha, Lamba Sigma chapter
Multicultural Greek Sororities
Delta Alpha Sigma, Eta Colony
National Pan-Hellenic Sororities
Delta Sigma Theta, Upsilon Epsilon chapter
Greek Fraternities
Sigma Alpha Epsilon, Texas Zeta chapter                                    (suspended in 2021)
Kappa Sigma, Rho Nu chapter
Delta Sigma Phi (currently Inactive)
Pi Kappa Phi, Theta Pi associate chapter (currently Inactive)
Alpha Tau Omega, Colony
FarmHouse Fraternity, Associate Chapter
Recreational Sports
Student Activities
Student Government Association
Student Organizations
American Society of Civil Engineers Student Chapter (awarded Best ASCE Student Chapter in Texas in 2008, 2009, 2010, 2011, 2012, 2013, and 2019.  Texas-Mexico Region Concrete Canoe Champions 2009, 2012, and 2013)
Institute of Electrical and Electronics Engineers Corona Chapter
Association of Technology, Management, and Applied Engineering (ATMAE) Student Chapter. Only ATMAE student chapter in the world to win the Outstanding Student Chapter Award three consecutive years and to also win it a total of five times (2011, 2012, 2013, 2015, and 2016).
 Honor Fraternities
 Beta Alpha Psi
 Beta Gamma Sigma
 Kappa Kappa Psi
 Epsilon Pi Tau
 Phi Alpha Theta

Debate 
UT Tyler competes in the National Parliamentary Debate Association. The debate team at UT Tyler has a rich history of national success making five national finals appearances: Sam Cook and Steven Hullum (NPTE 2015 and 2016); Ayush Kumar and Mason Remaley (NPTE 2020, 2022, and NPDA 2022). Cook and Hullum were the NPTE 2016 national champions.

Athletics 

UT Tyler competes in the Lone Star Conference of the NCAA's Division II. The current 2020–21 school year is the last of the program's planned three-year transition from Division III. Both the men's and women's sports teams are referred to as the Patriots.

The school does not have a football program.

UT Tyler participates in the following fifteen sports: Men's sports include baseball, basketball, cross country, golf, soccer, tennis and track & field, while women's sports include basketball, cross country, golf, soccer, softball, tennis, track & field and volleyball.

Since 2005, UT Tyler student-athletes have won 29 American Southwest Conference Championships, 29 ASC East Division championships, made 32 team appearances in the NCAA postseason and had 26 students earn All-America or Academic All-America Honors.

Media 
Besides its newspaper, the Patriot Talon, UT Tyler has its own campus radio station, KVUT, a source of NPR news and programs, local news and public affairs, and jazz music during evening and overnight hours.

Notable alumni 
Glenn Canfield Jr. (deceased) – former president of Thermo-Tech Co., Chairperson of the Republican Party of Gregg County, Texas
Bryan Hughes – Republican member of the Texas House of Representatives from Wood County since 2003
Brittany Mahomes – co-owner of Kansas City NWSL and wife of NFL quarterback Patrick Mahomes, played soccer at UT Tyler before a brief professional career
Brandon Rhyder – Texas Country/Red Dirt singer
Craig Tiley – CEO of Tennis Australia and Director of the Australian Open

See also
Rodney H. Mabry, third president of The University of Texas at Tyler for 18 years (retired, 2016)

References

External links 

UT Tyler Athletics website

 
Educational institutions established in 1971
Universities and colleges accredited by the Southern Association of Colleges and Schools
Tyler
Public universities and colleges in Texas
Education in Tyler, Texas
Education in Smith County, Texas
Buildings and structures in Tyler, Texas